Martin Ward may refer to:

 Martin Ward (boxer, born 1988), English bantam and featherweight boxer
 Martin Joseph Ward (born 1991), English super featherweight boxer
 Martin Ward (American football) (born 1989), Marshall University running back
 Martin Ward, a character from the film Bon Cop, Bad Cop